Henry Hemmendinger (April 1, 1915 – August 16, 2003) was an American color scientist.

Early career
Hemmendinger's work in color standardization and measurement established him as one of the world's preeminent experts in color science. After graduating from Harvard and Princeton, Hemmendinger joined the U.S. Navy and worked in submarine warfare research. During his service, he met his future business partner Hugh Davidson. After the war, both men worked in general physics at General Aniline & Film Corporation, where they became increasingly interested in colorimetry and color theory. Their first contribution to the field was their development of the Automatic Tristimulus Integrator, the first device to enable rapid automatic measurement of XYZ values of the color spectrum.

Development of color-matching computers
In 1952 Hemmendinger and Davidson left General Aniline & Film to form Davidson and Hemmendinger. Their first successful product was a colorant-mixture analog computer, COMIC, introduced in 1958, the first automated color matching system. Hemmendinger also evaluated colors for the Munsell books, and his contributions are still used as standards.

In 1967, Hemmendinger and Davidson developed COMIC II, a digital version of their earlier color matching computer. Shortly after this, their company was sold to Kollmorgen and combined with their Macbeth Instrument Development Laboratories. Hemmendinger left Kollmorgen in 1970 and formed the Hemmendinger Color Laboratory, a consulting firm specializing in colorimetric and spectrophotometric standards.

Contributions to the field
Hemmendinger received the Godlove Award from the Inter-Society Color Council for his work, and frequently consulted with the National Bureau of Standards. His companies were frequently the only U.S. supplier of calibrated color materials used to evaluate color measurement instruments.

Selected publications

References

External links
 The Henry Hemmendinger papers are available at Hagley Museum and Library

1915 births
Color scientists
2003 deaths
Harvard University alumni
Princeton University alumni